"New Killer Star" is a song written and performed by David Bowie in 2003 for his album Reality. This was the first single from the album.

While it is uncertain what the song is really about (like other Bowie songs), the lyrics make oblique reference to life in post-9/11 New York City.  However the video clip, directed by Brumby Boylston of National Television, tells a surreal story using lenticular-postcard-like images of a spaceship almost crashing into the modern American heartland. Bowie himself said of the song: "I'm not a political commentator, but I think there are times when I'm stretched to at least implicate what's happening politically in the songs that I'm writing.  And there was some nod, in a very abstract way, toward the wrongs that are being made at the moment with the Middle Eastern situation. I think that song is a pretty good manifesto for the whole record."

The song title is a play on the words 'nuclear star'.

The b-side is a cover of Sigue Sigue Sputnik's "Love Missile F1-11"

Music video
The music video features lenticular images throughout.

Track listing

CD: ISO-Columbia / COL 674275 1 (Italy) 
 "New Killer Star" - 4:40
 "Love Missile F1-11"

CD: ISO-Columbia / 38K 3445 (Canada)
 "New Killer Star" (Edit) - 3:42
 "Love Missile F1-11"

DVD: ISO/Columbia COL 674275 9 (Austria)
 "New Killer Star (Video version)" - 3:40
 "Reality (Electronic Press Kit)"
 "Love Missile F1-11"

Charts

Personnel
According to Chris O'Leary:
 David Bowie – vocals, rhythm guitar, Korg Trinity, keyboards
 Earl Slick – guitar
 David Torn – guitar
 Gail Ann Dorsey – background vocals
 Sterling Campbell – drums
 Catherine Russell – background vocals
 Tony Visconti – bass
 Mark Plati – bass

Production
David Bowie – producer
Tony Visconti – producer, engineer
Mario J. McNulty – engineer

See also
 List of anti-war songs

References

2003 singles
Columbia Records singles
David Bowie songs
Music about the September 11 attacks
Songs written by David Bowie
Song recordings produced by Tony Visconti